The Laslea is a left tributary of the river Târnava Mare in Romania. It discharges into the Târnava Mare near the village Laslea.

References

Rivers of Romania
Rivers of Sibiu County